Built from 1938-40, the Art Deco style Model Tobacco Building is the primary six-story building of a six building collection of buildings comprising a former tobacco factory.  Located at 1100 Jefferson Davis Highway (U.S. Route 1), in Richmond, Virginia, the building was designed by the Chicago architecture firm of Schmidt, Garden and Erikson and is known for the 9' tall Moderne MODEL TOBACCO letters which dominate the north end of the building.

It is one of many Art Deco buildings in Richmond, including assorted buildings on Grace Street including the Central National Bank building, the Virginia Union Belgian Building, Medical College of Virginia's West Hospital, Henrico Theatre, Thomas Jefferson High School (Richmond, Virginia), and Nolde Bakery, 306-308 North 26th Street, and the Patrick Henry Building on 1111 E. Board Street built in 1938-40.

Future
A developer, Hunt Investments LLC, has proposed turning the property into over 600 apartments, with a projected cost of $84 million. The development will offer an indoor pool, a fitness center, jogging trail, a childcare center, and individual security for each of the housing units.  Over 600 apartments will be developed in a mix of both market rate and workforce housing in three phases. Less than five minutes from the central downtown business district via a divided 4 lane highway, this historic Model Tobacco destination will become the flagship for renewal of the Jeff Davis Corridor. In 2020 the property was sold.

References

New life for old leaf site planned, by MICHAEL MARTZ, The Richmond Times-Dispatch, January 23, 2008.
Architecture in Virginia, by William B. O'Neal, Virginia Museum, Walker & Co., 1968.
Model Tobacco: Then and Now, by Marion Andretski, The Richmond Times-Dispatch, September 30, 1998.

External links
Photos
Richmond Citywatch Info
Agility Nut Art Deco Survey
Art Deco in America Survey

Art Deco architecture in Virginia
Tobacco buildings in the United States
Buildings and structures in Richmond, Virginia
Office buildings completed in 1940